Mary Vincent (born 1963) is an artist and victims' advocate. She became known to the public after surviving a violent attack in which her arms were cut off while hitchhiking in 1978. Vincent has focused her adult life on her art, and she generally avoids the public spotlight.

Early life 
Vincent is one of seven children and lived with her parents in Las Vegas. Her father worked as a mechanic and married her mother, a blackjack dealer, while serving in the military. Vincent's parents were going through a messy divorce which caused her to run away from their home in Las Vegas. After a brief period living on the streets and inside unlocked cars, Vincent hitchhiked to her grandfather's home in Berkeley, California in September 1978.

Attack 
After arriving in California and staying with her grandfather for a while, Vincent became homesick and decided to hitchhike back to Las Vegas. While hitchhiking back to Las Vegas, Vincent was picked up by Lawrence Singleton, who violently raped and attacked her. After his attack, he left Vincent for dead, severing both of her forearms with a hatchet. Vincent then climbed the cliff she was thrown off, and walked nearly three miles to get help from drivers on nearby Interstate 5.

Aftermath and recovery 
In the hospital, Vincent immediately worked with police to help identify and find her attacker, insisting she postpone sleep to finish creating a composite sketch for investigators. She also testified in Singleton's trial, leading to his ultimate conviction. Vincent won a civil judgment against her attacker and was awarded $2.56 million, but did not receive the payment due to her attacker's unemployment and inability to pay.

Adult life 
Vincent began using prosthetic arms within two weeks after the attack. As someone who likes to "tinker", Vincent has used spare parts from broken-down electronics to modify her prosthetics into custom designs. Among the changes in her life after the attack, she began a career in art. As an adult, Vincent attended the University of Nevada, Las Vegas. She married and subsequently divorced a man named Tom, and she has two sons.

Advocacy 
After her attacker was released from prison and attacked and murdered a woman, Vincent volunteered to testify against him again at his trial. She spoke openly about finding healing by becoming a victims' advocate in support of victims' rights and delivers motivational speeches.

Art 
Vincent works with chalk pastels to create "powerfully upbeat women" like "female action figures". She also draws family and individual portraits on commission. Her customized prosthetics are also self-creations, including a custom prosthetic for bowling.

References 

1963 births
Living people
20th-century American women artists
21st-century American women artists
Survivors
University of Nevada, Las Vegas alumni
People from Las Vegas
American amputees